The 2012–13 Elon Phoenix men's basketball team represented Elon University during the 2012–13 NCAA Division I men's basketball season. The Phoenix, led by fourth year head coach Matt Matheny, played their home games at Alumni Gym and were members of the North Division of the Southern Conference. They finished the season 21–12, 13–5 in SoCon play to win the North Division championship. They advanced to the semifinals of the SoCon tournament where they lost to the College of Charleston. They were invited to the 2013 CIT, their first ever Division I postseason tournament appearance, where they lost in the first round to Canisius.

Roster

Schedule

|-
!colspan=9| Regular season

|-
!colspan=9| Regular season

|-
!colspan=9| 2013 Southern Conference men's basketball tournament

|-
!colspan=9| 2013 CIT

References

Elon Phoenix men's basketball seasons
Southern Conference men's basketball champion seasons
Elon
Elon